Eduardo Nájera (born 27 September 1948) is an Ecuadorian gymnast. He competed in seven events at the 1968 Summer Olympics.

References

1948 births
Living people
Ecuadorian male artistic gymnasts
Olympic gymnasts of Ecuador
Gymnasts at the 1968 Summer Olympics
Sportspeople from Quito